Hare & Hare was a landscape architecture firm founded in Kansas City, Missouri, in 1910 by the father-and-son team of Sid J. Hare and S. Herbert Hare. A number of their works are listed on the National Register of Historic Places.

Notable works
Charles S. Keith House (Kansas City, Missouri)
Fort Worth Botanic Garden (Fort Worth, Texas)
Horn-Vincent-Russell Estate (Mission Hills, Kansas)
Lucius P. Buchanan House (Joplin, Missouri)
Monongahela Cemetery (Monongahela City, Pennsylvania)
Philbrook Museum of Art (Tulsa, Oklahoma)
Robert Alexander Long High School (Longview, Washington)

References

External links
Cultural Landscape Foundation profile
State Historical Society of Missouri profile

Architecture firms of the United States